is the second studio album by Japanese singer-songwriter and Sakerock frontman Gen Hoshino. It was released in Japan on 28 September 2011 on CD on Speedstar Records and Haruomi Hosono's Daisyworld Discs.

Episode is the follow-up to Baka no Uta, Hoshino's debut as a solo artist. It reached No. 5 at Oricon album charts. The only single from the album, "Kudaranai no Naka ni", was released on CD on 2 March 2011.

Track listing

CD

Charts and sales

Weekly charts

Sales

References

External links
 Speedstar Records

2011 albums
Gen Hoshino albums